A jon boat (or johnboat) is a flat-bottomed boat constructed of aluminum, fiberglass, wood, or polyethelene with one, two, or three seats, usually bench type. They are suitable for fishing, hunting and cruising. The nearly flat hull of a jon boat tends to ride over the waves rather than cut through them as a V-hull might; this shallow draft – only a few inches – enables the jon boat to operate in very shallow water, but limits its use to calm waters. Jon boats typically have a transom onto which an outboard motor can be mounted. They are simple and easy to maintain, and inexpensive, though with many options to upgrade. Typical options may include live wells/bait wells, side or center consoles, factory installed decks and floors, electrical wiring, accessory pads/mountings, and casting and poling platforms.

The simple design includes an open hull, without a bilge, leaving the ribs exposed. Many users choose to cover the ribs, producing a flat, level surface.

The Wasserwacht branch of the German Red Cross has chosen jon boats for their civil protection units for use during floods.

History
In the late 19th century flat-bottom boats became popular in The Ozarks, being ideal for traversing the shallow waters in the Missouri Valley.

These vessels were found useful for float fishing, duck hunting and carrying timber. Visiting tourists and travellers enjoyed the idea of flat-bottomed boats, as they could fish standing up and did not have to fear tipping over.

Jet-drive propulsion  

Jon boats with beefed-up aluminum construction, and powered by jet-drive outboards, are becoming more popular since they are capable of operating in extremely shallow water. They are thus frequently used in rocky rivers and areas where submerged obstructions, such as oyster bars and coral, might damage a boat with a deeper draught.

References

Boat types